The 2009 NASCAR Nationwide Series began on February 14 at Daytona International Speedway with the Camping World 300. The season concluded on November 21 at Homestead–Miami Speedway with the Ford 300. With 25 top-five finishes, Kyle Busch was the season champion. He finished 210 points clear of Carl Edwards and 318 ahead of Brad Keselowski.

Double-file restarts
Before the start of the season, NASCAR changed restart rules regarding the final moments of all races in the Sprint Cup, Nationwide Series and Camping World Truck Series.  Previously, when the race was inside the final ten laps, all cars/trucks on the lead lap were in a single-file restart in that window.  As of the 2009 season, the window changed to the final 20 laps.  The "lucky dog"/"free pass" rule was still be eliminated in the last ten laps of a race. This rule will not matter starting at the July Daytona race, with the addition of "Double-File Restarts Shootout Style."

After being successful in the NASCAR Sprint Cup Series, NASCAR will implement a double-file restart system starting at the July Daytona race. The entire field will line up double-file, much like the start of the race at every restart. The leaders and other lead lap cars are now in front always when taking the green flag. Cars who choose to stay out and not pit during a caution flag who are in front of the leaders are now waved-around to restart (double file) at the back of the field. The lucky dog/free pass rule is now in effect the entire distance of the race, and the double-file restarts are for every restart, including green-white-checkered finishes. The only reason cars do not line up double-file in the order they are position wise on the leaderboard is if they are serving a penalty (in most cases, for pit road violations). The leader of the race also has the option of selecting which lane, inside or outside, to restart in, however, the 3rd place car (and 5th, 7th, and so on) will always restart on the inside.

Schedule

♣ – Race ran at night, or started in the late afternoon, and finished at night.

Bold italics – Indicates current or next race.

Teams

Full schedule

 Penske purchased the #59 car's 2008 owner's points from JTG Daugherty Racing for the 2009 season.
 The #23 car's owners points were purchased from JD Motorsports for the season, coming from the #01 car in 2008.
 RAB Racing used Jay Robinson's #4 car's owner points from 2008, which had previously belonged to James Finch.
 The 07 team used the former Fitz Motorsports' teams owner points. Fitz now runs as Trail Motorsports.

Limited schedule

Races

Camping World 300 
The Camping World 300 was held February 14 at Daytona International Speedway. Kevin Harvick took the pole but Tony Stewart won the race.

Did not qualify: Larry Foyt (#56), Johnny Chapman (#90), Stanton Barrett (#31), Terry Cook (#91), Derrike Cope (#41), Johnny Borneman, III (#22).

Stater Brothers 300
The Stater Brothers 300 was held February 21 at Auto Club Speedway. Carl Edwards took the pole but Kyle Busch won the race.

Did not qualify: Scott Wimmer (#40), Johnny Borneman, III (#22), Mike Harmon (#84), Andy Ponstein (#02).

Sam's Town 300
The Sam's Town 300 was held February 28 at Las Vegas Motor Speedway. Scott Speed took the pole but Greg Biffle won the race.

Did not qualify: Derrike Cope (#41), Kertus Davis (#49), Johnny Borneman, III (#22), Mike Harmon (#84).

Scotts Turf Builder 300
The Scotts Turf Builder 300 was held March 21 at Bristol Motor Speedway. Brendan Gaughan got his first Nationwide series career pole but Kevin Harvick won the race.

Did not qualify: Mark Green (#70), Kertus Davis (#49), Brad Teague (#55), Brian Keselowski (#26), Stanton Barrett (#31), Mike Harmon (#84), Benny Gordon (#72).

O'Reilly 300
The O'Reilly 300 was held April 4 at Texas Motor Speedway. Kyle Busch took the pole and won the race.

Did not qualify: Scott Wimmer (#40), Josh Wise (#43), Brian Keselowski (#26), Kertus Davis (#49), Kerry Earnhardt (#31), Mike Harmon (#84).

Nashville 300
The Nashville 300 was held on April 11 Nashville Superspeedway. Joey Logano won his 2nd career NNS race. 1992 series champion Joe Nemechek took a wild ride after contact with several cars and flipped once. The car was fine, and he drove it around the track a few times before being black-flagged.

Did not qualify: Brad Teague (#52), Andy Ponstein (#02), Mike Harmon (#84), Ryan Hackett (#76), Mark Green (#0).

Bashas' Supermarket 200
The Bashas' Supermarket 200 was held April 17 at Phoenix International Raceway. Carl Edwards took the pole but Greg Biffle won the race.

Did not qualify: Kenny Hendrick (#42), Andy Ponstein (#02), Mike Harmon (#84), Dennis Setzer (#96).

Aaron's 312
The Aaron's 312 was held April 25 at Talladega Superspeedway. David Ragan edged out Ryan Newman by .030 of a second for his first win in any of NASCAR's three top-tier series. Matt Kenseth had a scary wreck in which he flipped 3 times on the backstretch. The defending Daytona 500 champion was uninjured, though.

Did not qualify: Johnny Chapman (#90), Justin Hobgood (#91), Scott Wimmer (#40), Mike Harmon (#84).

Lipton Tea 250
The Lipton Tea 250 was held May 1 at Richmond International Raceway. Matt Kenseth took the pole but Kyle Busch won the race.

Did not qualify: Kevin Hamlin (#52), Kenny Hendrick (#42), Travis Kittleson (#31), John Wes Townley (#09), Mike Harmon (#84).

Diamond Hill Plywood 200
The Diamond Hill Plywood 200 was held May 8 at Darlington Raceway. The qualify rained out so Kyle Busch started 1st but Matt Kenseth won the race.

Did not qualify: Dennis Setzer (#96), Paul Menard (#98), Derrike Cope (#73), Justin Hobgood (#41).

CarQuest Auto Parts 300
The CarQuest Auto Parts 300 was held May 23 at Lowe's Motor Speedway. Carl Edwards took the pole. The race was shortened to 170 laps due to rain so Mike Bliss won the race.

Did not qualify: Morgan Shepherd (#89), Casey Atwood (#05), John Wes Townley (#09), Kevin Lepage (#52), Kertus Davis (#49), Marc Davis (#36), Mike Harmon (#84).

Heluva Good! 200
The Heluva Good! 200 was held May 30 at Dover International Speedway. Joey Logano took the pole but Brad Keselowski won the race.

Did not qualify: Jeffrey Earnhardt (#31).

Federated Auto Parts 300
The Federated Auto Parts 300 was held June 6 at Nashville Superspeedway and was dominated by Kyle Busch. This was his first win in Nashville. The victory made news as Kyle smashed the trophy – a custom painted Gibson guitar – in victory lane.

Did not qualify: Justin Hobgood (#41), Daryl Harr (#31).

Meijer 300
The Meijer 300 was held June 13 at Kentucky Speedway. Joey Logano took the pole and won the race.

Did not qualify: Jeff Green (#91), J. C. Stout (#19), Benny Gordon (#72), Blake Bjorklund (#96), Kevin Lepage (#52), Travis Kittleson (#31).

NorthernTool.com 250
The NorthernTool.com 250 was held June 20 at Milwaukee Mile. Erik Darnell got his first Nationwide series career pole but Carl Edwards won the race.

Did not qualify: Morgan Shepherd (#89), Kevin Lepage (#52), Stanton Barrett (#41), John Wes Townley (#09).

Camping World RV Sales 200 presented by Turtle Wax
The Camping World RV Sales 200 presented by Turtle Wax was held June 27 at New Hampshire Motor Speedway. Joey Logano won the pole for the third straight race he attempted. Kyle Busch won the race.

Did not qualify: Justin Hobgood (#41), Morgan Shepherd (#89), Kertus Davis (#04), Mike Wallace (#0).

Subway Jalapeño 250
The Subway Jalapeño 250 was held July 3 at Daytona International Speedway. Clint Bowyer took the pole and won the race.

Did not qualify: Terry Cook (#91), Brian Keselowski (#26), Mike Wallace (#0).

Dollar General 300 (Chicagoland)
The Dollar General 300 was held July 10 at Chicagoland Speedway. Carl Edwards took the pole but Joey Logano won the race.

Did not qualify: Johnny Chapman (#90), J. C. Stout (#19), Stanton Barrett (#31), Kevin Hamlin (#52), Morgan Shepherd (#89), Brian Keselowski (#96).

Missouri-Illinois Dodge Dealers 250
The Missouri-Illinois Dodge Dealers 250 was held July 18 at Gateway International Raceway. Brad Keselowski took the pole but Kyle Busch won the race.

Did not qualify: Morgan Shepherd (#89), Jeff Green (#85), Kertus Davis (#04), Joe Ruttman (#71), Stanton Barrett (#31), Brad Teague (#52).

Kroger 200
The Kroger 200 was held July 25 at O'Reilly Raceway Park. Trevor Bayne took the pole but Carl Edwards won the race.

Did not qualify: Dennis Setzer (#96), Brian Keselowski (#26), Joe Ruttman (#71), John Wes Townley (#09), Mike Wallace (#0).

U.S. Cellular 250
The U.S. Cellular 250 was held August 1 and was the inaugural Nationwide series race at Iowa Speedway. Ricky Stenhouse Jr. and Justin Allgaier tied for the pole but Stenhouse started 1st. Brad Keselowski won the race.

Did not qualify: Shelby Howard (#70), Peyton Sellers (#77), Kenny Hendrick (#75), Derrike Cope (#78), Andy Ponstein (#96), Jack Smith (#52), Chris Horn (#58).

Zippo 200
The Zippo 200 was held August 8 at Watkins Glen International. Kevin Harvick took the pole but Marcos Ambrose won the race.

Did not qualify: Peyton Sellers (#77), Daryl Harr (#31), Brad Baker (#05), Scott Gaylord (#52), Brett Rowe (#75).

Carfax 250
The Carfax 250 was held August 15 at Michigan International Speedway. Brian Vickers took the pole but Brad Keselowski won the race.

Did not qualify: Kevin Lepage (#73), Jason White (#07), Casey Atwood (#05), Kertus Davis (#0), Derrike Cope (#78), J. C. Stout (#19), Morgan Shepherd (#89), John Wes Townley (#09).

Food City 250
The Food City 250 was held August 21 at Bristol Motor Speedway. Brad Keselowski took the pole but David Ragan won the race.

Did not qualify: Dennis Setzer (#96), Kertus Davis (#0), Shelby Howard (#70), Travis Kittleson (#31), Scott Lagasse Jr. (#42), Morgan Shepherd (#89).

NAPA Auto Parts 200 presented by Dodge
All practice and qualifying was done in the wet using rain tires. The final 16 laps of the race were also run under wet conditions using rain tires. For the third consecutive year, Marcos Ambrose dominated the race, but he blew the final corner by jumping over the curb too high, giving Edwards the win. Ambrose also won the pole.

Did not qualify: Daryl Harr (#31), Morgan Shepherd (#89).

Degree Men V12 300
The Degree Men V12 300 was held September 5 at Atlanta Motor Speedway. Dale Earnhardt Jr. took the pole but Kevin Harvick won the race.

Did not qualify: Derrike Cope (#73), Morgan Shepherd (#89), John Wes Townley (#09), J. C. Stout (#0), Tony Ave (#52).

Virginia 529 College Savings 250
The Virginia 529 College Savings 250 was held September 11 at Richmond International Raceway. Denny Hamlin took the pole but Carl Edwards won the race.

Did not qualify: Derrike Cope (#73), Casey Atwood (#05), Morgan Shepherd (#89), Chris Lawson (#52).

Dover 200
The Dover 200 was held September 26 at Dover International Speedway. Kyle Busch took the pole but Clint Bowyer won the race.

Did not qualify: J. C. Stout (#0).

Kansas Lottery 300
The Kansas Lottery 300 was held October 3 at Kansas Speedway. Parker Kligerman got his first Nationwide series career pole. Joey Logano won the race.

Did not qualify: Michael McDowell (#96), Kevin Hamlin (#52), Willie Allen (#92), Derrike Cope (#73), Jennifer Jo Cobb (#79), Morgan Shepherd (#89), Chris Horn (#58), Andy Ponstein (#02).

Copart 300
The Copart 300 was held October 10 at Auto Club Speedway. Joey Logano took the pole and won the race.

Did not qualify: Stanton Barrett (#31), Jarit Johnson (#44), Casey Atwood (#05).

Dollar General 300 (Charlotte)
The Dollar General 300 was held October 16 at Lowe's Motor Speedway. Carl Edwards took the pole but Kyle Busch won the race.

Did not qualify: Terry Cook (#91), Kevin Lepage (#78), Casey Atwood (#05), Derrike Cope (#73), Peyton Sellers (#77), Morgan Shepherd (#89).

Kroger on Track for the Cure 250
The Kroger on Track for the Cure 250 was held October 24 at Memphis Motorsports Park. Justin Allgaier got his first Nationwide career pole. Kyle Busch nudged Brad Keselowski on the final turn but Keselowski held on and won the race.

Did not qualify: Johnny Chapman (#90), Todd Kluever (#42), Kevin Lepage (#78), Nick Joanides (#31), Mark Green (#49), Jarit Johnson (#44), Brad Teague (#52) Sydney James Harcourt (79).

O'Reilly Challenge
The O'Reilly Challenge was held November 7 at Texas Motor Speedway. Matt Kenseth took the pole but Kyle Busch won the race.

Did not qualify: Casey Atwood (#85), Mike Harmon (#84), Andy Ponstein (#02).

Able Body Labor 200
The Able Body Labor 200 was held November 14 at Phoenix International Raceway. Denny Hamlin won the pole with a new track record. Carl Edwards won the race.

Did not qualify: Chris Lawson (#52), Blake Koch (#05), Morgan Shepherd (#89), Daryl Harr (#31).

Ford 300
The Ford 300 was held November 21 at Homestead-Miami Speedway. Carl Edwards won the pole. Kyle Busch won the race and the championship. Denny Hamlin also spun Brad Keselowski earlier in the race.

Did not qualify: Jeremy Clements (#0), Chase Austin (#58), Johnny Borneman, III (#83), Parker Kligerman (#22), Morgan Shepherd (#89), Eddie MacDonald (#39), Jennifer Jo Cobb (#84), Brian Keselowski (#96), Benny Gordon (#72).

Final standings

Drivers 
The top 10

Full Drivers' Championship
(key) Bold – Pole position awarded by time. Italics – Pole position set by owner's points. * – Most laps led.

See also 
 2009 NASCAR Sprint Cup Series
 2009 NASCAR Camping World Truck Series
 2009 NASCAR Camping World East Series
 2009 NASCAR Camping World West Series
 2009 NASCAR Corona Series
 2009 NASCAR Mini Stock Series
 2009 NASCAR Canadian Tire Series

NASCAR Xfinity Series seasons